Babicka or Babička may refer to:

 Babička (The Grandmother), an 1855 novel by Božena Němcová
 Babicka (1922 film), a Czech film
 Babička (1940 film), a Czech film from Němcová's novel
 Babička (1971 film), a Czech TV film
 Babicka (2003 film), a Czech film
 7490 Babička, an asteroid
 "Babička", a song by Karel Gott